Bassianus may refer to:

 Caracalla (Lucius Septimius Bassianus, 188–217), Roman Emperor
 Julius Bassianus (died 217), Emesene High Priest
 Marcus Julius Gessius Bassianus, Roman priest during the reign of Caracalla
 Elagabalus, Roman Emperor
 Bassianus (senator) (died 316), senator executed by Constantine the Great
 Saint Bassianus of Lodi ( – ), bishop of Lodi, Italy
 Bassianus (bishop), bishop of Ephesus
 Joannes Bassianus (12th century), Italian jurist